John McCarton (1847–1887) was a United States Navy sailor and a recipient of the United States military's highest decoration, the Medal of Honor.

Biography
Born in 1847 in Brooklyn, New York, McCarton joined the Navy from that state. By January 4, 1882, he was serving as a ship's printer on the training ship . On that day, while New Hampshire was off Coaster's Harbor Island in Newport, Rhode Island, he and another sailor, Quartermaster Henry J. Manning, jumped overboard in an attempt to save Second Class Musician Jabez Smith from drowning. For this action, both McCarton and Manning were awarded the Medal of Honor three years later, on October 18, 1884.

McCarton's official Medal of Honor citation reads:
For jumping overboard from the U.S. Training Ship New Hampshire off Coasters Harbor Island, near Newport, R.l., 4 January 1882, and endeavoring to rescue Jabez Smith, second class musician, from drowning.

See also

List of Medal of Honor recipients during peacetime

References

External links

1847 births
1887 deaths
People from Brooklyn
United States Navy sailors
United States Navy Medal of Honor recipients
Non-combat recipients of the Medal of Honor